Bundanon is a unique national arts organisation situated near Nowra, City of Shoalhaven, New South Wales, Australia. It was the home of the painter Arthur Boyd. Established as a national Trust in 1993, The organisation creates learning programs for students of all ages and operates Australia's largest artist in residence program. In preserving the natural and cultural heritage of its site Bundanon promotes the value of landscape in all our lives.

From late 2021 Bundanon's facilities will dramatically expand with the opening of a new Art Museum and Bridge for creative learning.

Description and history

The Bundanon properties are located on the land of the Wodi Wodi, of the Yuin nation who speak the Dharawal language, of the South Coast and the Illawarra. From the mid 19th century, the Shoalhaven River supported many farm properties and provided a mechanism for European occupants to bring their produce to the coast for sale.

European occupation was established at Bundanon in 1831 through a grant of 600 acres made to Richard Henry Browne. The land grant was conditional on the clearing of 55 acres, which were to be fenced and cultivated within five years. This work was not completed and the property was sold to Dr Kenneth Mackenzie on 19 March 1838. From the available evidence Bundanon Homestead, completed in 1866, was constructed using well detailed machine sawn timber in the roof, floors and ceilings.

Bundanon's history as a farm property is still evident in many of the buildings on site, including those that were re-purposed and restored to form the vibrant Artist in Residence complex.

Arthur Boyd at Bundanon 

In the early 1970s, Arthur Boyd purchased Riversdale on the banks of the Shoalhaven River near Bundanon and added to the buildings to create a home and studio. Arthur and Yvonne Boyd purchased Bundanon from Sandra and Tony McGrath and Frank McDonald in the summer of 1979.  

After building a studio at Bundanon in 1982, Boyd painted a series of large, iconic Shoalhaven images based on the river and bush around Bundanon. He was commissioned to design the tapestry for Great Hall of New Parliament House and created 16 canvases for the foyer of Victorian Arts Centre.

The gift and establishment of Bundanon Trust 
At the memorial service for Sir Sidney Nolan on 28 January 1993, Prime Minister Paul Keating announced the Australian Government's acceptance of Arthur and Yvonne Boyd's gift of Bundanon and the intention to establish the Bundanon Trust. The gift included three properties – Bundanon, Riversdale, Eearie and Beeweeree) – as well as an extensive collection of artworks. Trustees were established by the Australian Government to oversee the operation of Bundanon Trust.

The Directors in the early years of the Trust's formation benefited from the input of Arthur and Yvonne Boyd and developed an ambitious vision for Bundanon's future. They commissioned internationally acclaimed architecture, established the Bundanon's world-renowned Artist in Residence program and opened the Bundanon properties to the public. Arthur and Yvonne Boyd's gift of Bundanon has given Australia a unique cultural and environmental asset. It was born out of Boyd's often stated belief that ‘you can’t own a landscape’ and the wish that others might also draw inspiration from the remarkable place.

The Collection 
A significant part of Arthur and Yvonne Boyd's 1993 gift of Bundanon was an extensive collection of artworks by Arthur Boyd and his family, in addition to works by Sidney Nolan, Brett Whiteley, Joy Hester and Charles Blackman. The Collection today includes contemporary work from previous artists in residence, commissions and generous donations.

In the 2019-2020 Black Summer Bushfires, many of the artworks were evacuated from the Bundanon property and stored in Sydney to ensure their safety. The collection will return to Bundanon at the end of 2021 with the completion of the new Art Museum, which includes world-class facilities to store and protect the artworks.

Art Museum 
In 2020 construction of a new light-filled contemporary art museum on Bundanon's Riversdale property was announced. Partially buried in the landscape, the new museum development sits at the heart of the new plan for Bundanon, with a dramatic bridge structure landing onto an expansive public plaza near the existing nineteenth century buildings. Kerstin Thompson Architects (KTA) have created a dynamic new plan for Arthur Boyd's iconic Bundanon property.

Included are an art museum, the Bridge, which houses the creative learning centre for school students, a visitor information centre, and accommodation and a café.
The new Bundanon art museum and gallery officially opened on 5 March 2022.

See also 

 Australian art
 Boyd family

References

External links 
 Bundanon property
 location via Google Maps

Art museums and galleries in New South Wales
Artists' studios in Australia
Historic house museums in New South Wales